Konstantinovsk is a town and the administrative center of Konstantinovsky District in Rostov Oblast, Russia, located on the Don River near the Seversky Donets. Population:

History
Town status was granted to Konstantinovsk in 1967.

Administrative and municipal status
Within the framework of administrative divisions, Konstantinovsk serves as the administrative center of Konstantinovsky District. As an administrative division, it is, together with five rural localities, incorporated within Konstantinovsky District as Konstantinovskoye Urban Settlement. As a municipal division, this administrative unit also has urban settlement status and is a part of Konstantinovsky Municipal District.

References

Notes

Sources

Cities and towns in Rostov Oblast
Don Host Oblast